The 1995 Rugby World Cup was preceded by a qualifying campaign in which forty-five nations were entered. 16 teams participated in the finals tournament in South Africa, seven of which came through qualifying matches. Eight were granted automatic entry as they were quarter-finalists at the 1991 Rugby World Cup, and South Africa qualified automatically as hosts.

Tournaments
 Africa qualification
 European qualification
 Americas qualification
 Asia qualification
 Oceania qualification

Qualified teams

References

 
1992 rugby union tournaments for national teams
1993 rugby union tournaments for national teams
1994 rugby union tournaments for national teams